Wang Gi may refer to:

King Jeonggan (1021–1069), Hyeonjong of Goryeo's son
Seonjong of Goryeo (1049–1094), Goryeo king
Crown Prince Hyoryeong (1149–1170 or after), Uijong of Goryeo's son
Gongmin of Goryeo (1330–1374), Goryeo king